Yuanyuan (YY) Zhou is a Chinese and American computer scientist and entrepreneur. She is a professor of computer science and engineering at the University of California, San Diego, where she holds the Qualcomm Endowed Chair in Mobile Computing. Her research concerns software reliability, including the use of data mining to automatically detect software bugs and flexible system designs that can adapt to hardware platform variations. She is also the founder of three start-up companies, Emphora, Pattern Insight, and Whova.

Education and career
Zhou earned a Bachelor of Science degree in 1992 from Peking University, before earning her M.A. in 1996 from Princeton University. She went on to earn her Ph.D. in 2001, also from Princeton University, under the supervision of Kai Li. She spent the next two years at the NEC Research Institute in Princeton, where she spun off a start-up from NEC, Emphora, in the area of data storage. Next, she took a faculty position at the University of Illinois Urbana-Champaign in 2002. During her time there, in 2007, she founded her second start-up, Pattern Insight, to commercialize her work in automated bug detection and removal for large software projects; she continues to serve as Pattern Insight's chief technical officer. In 2009, she moved to UCSD, as the first Qualcomm Professor in Mobile Computing. In 2012 she founded her third start-up, event-management software company Whova.

Zhou is the program chair for the 21st International Conference on Architectural Support for Programming Languages and Operating Systems (ASPLOS 2016), and the program co-chair for the 27th ACM Symposium on Operating Systems Principles (SOSP 2019).

Awards and honors
In 2005, Zhou won the Anita Borg Early Career Award of the Computing Research Association.
She was awarded a Sloan Fellowship in 2007. In 2013, she was named a Fellow of the Association for Computing Machinery "for contributions to software reliability and quality", and in 2014, she was named a Fellow of the Institute of Electrical and Electronics Engineers "for contributions to scalable algorithms and tools for computer reliability." In 2015, Zhou won the ACM SIGOPS Mark Weiser Award.

Speaking
Zhou has spoken at many academic and business conferences, including CRA-W Grad Cohort for Women in 2018, and the Grace Hopper Celebration of Women in Computing.

References

External links
Home page

PatternInsight
Whova

Year of birth missing (living people)
Living people
American computer scientists
Chinese computer scientists
Chinese women computer scientists
Peking University alumni
Princeton University alumni
University of Illinois Urbana-Champaign faculty
University of California, San Diego faculty
Fellows of the Association for Computing Machinery
Fellow Members of the IEEE
NEC people